This is a list of universities, colleges, seminaries, and schools (and their school districts) in Kansas City, Missouri and the surrounding Kansas City metropolitan area. School districts included: Independence, North Kansas City, Park Hill, Kansas City, Kansas, Kansas City, Missouri, Belton, Hickman Mills, Oak Grove, Liberty, Platte County, Raymore-Peculiar and Raytown, Missouri.

Universities and colleges 
 Army Command and General Staff College, Fort Leavenworth, Ks.
 Avila University, Catholic university of the Sisters of St. Joseph of Carondelet, Kansas City, Mo.
 Baker University, branch of School of Professional and Graduate Studies (Overland Park, KS)
 Benedictine College Founded 1858. Only Catholic College in America with a Nobel Prize winning graduate. Atchison, Ks.
 Calvary University, Founded 1932, Kansas City, Mo.
 Columbia College, a private co-educational liberal arts university.
 DeVry University, Kansas City, Mo.
 Donnelly College, Two-year Catholic college founded in 1949, located in Kansas City, Ks.
 Friends University Kansas City Area Center, master's degree programs including Master of Science in Family Therapy, Lenexa, Ks.
 Graceland University, Independence, Mo.
 Johnson County Community College, Overland Park, Ks.
 Kansas Christian College, Overland Park, Ks.
 Kansas City Art Institute, four-year college of fine arts and design founded in 1885, Kansas City, Mo.
 Kansas City Kansas Community College, 2-year college, Kansas City, Ks.
 Kansas City University of Medicine and Biosciences, Kansas City, Mo.
 Kansas State University, Olathe, Ks.
 Metropolitan Community College), a 2-year college with several branches in the Kansas City, Mo. metropolitan area.
 MidAmerica Nazarene University, a 4-year private Nazarene liberal-arts university, Olathe, KS 
 Ottawa University, Overland Park, Ks.
 Park University, Parkville, Independence, Lenexa, and downtown Kansas City, Mo.
 Rockhurst University, a notable Jesuit university founded in 1910, Kansas City, Mo.
 Rasmussen College, Overland Park, Ks.
 University of Kansas, Edwards Campus, Overland Park, Ks. 
 University of Kansas Medical Center - Kansas City, Ks; branch of the University of Kansas (in nearby Lawrence, KS) that focuses on medical education.
 Saint Luke's College of Health Sciences, Kansas City Missouri. 
 University of Missouri, Kansas City, Mo, one of four University of Missouri campuses, serving more than 14,000 undergraduates
 University of Saint Mary, Leavenworth, Ks
 Webster University, Kansas City, Mo, founded in 1915, in Kansas City since 1972. Evening programs for adult learners
 William Jewell College, Liberty, Mo.

Seminaries 
 Midwestern Baptist Theological Seminary, Southern Baptist Convention, Kansas City, Missouri.
 Nazarene Theological Seminary, Church of the Nazarene, Kansas City, Missouri.
 Calvary University, Kansas City, Missouri.
 Saint Paul School of Theology, Methodist, Leawood, Kansas.
 Expositors Seminary, TES, Kansas City, Missouri.

High schools 
 Academie Lafayette International High School (KCMO)
 Archbishop O'Hara High School (KCMO)
 Afrikan Centered Education Collegium Campus (KCMO)
 The Barstow School
 Belton High (Belton)
 Bishop Miege High School
 Bishop Ward High School (KCKS)
 Blue Springs High School (Blue Springs)
 Blue Springs South High School (Blue Springs)
 Center High School (C58)
 Central High (KCMO)
 Christ Prep Academy (Lenexa, KS)
 East High (KCMO)
 F.L. Schlagle High School (KCKS)
 Fort Osage High School (KCMO)
 Frontier School of Excellence-High School (KCMO)
 Frontier STEM High School (KCMO)
 Grain Valley High School (Grain Valley, Missouri)
 J.C. Harmon High (KCKS)
 Kansas City Academy (MO)
 Kansas City Christian School (KS)
 Kearney High School (Kearney, Missouri)
 Lee's Summit High School (Lee's Summit)
 Lee's Summit North High School (Lee's Summit)
 Lee's Summit West High School (Lee's Summit)
 Liberty High School (Liberty, Missouri) (Liberty)
 Liberty North High (Liberty)
 Lincoln College Preparatory Academy (KCMO)
 Maranatha Christian Academy (Shawnee)
 Maur Hill - Mount Academy (Founded 1863) (Benedictine Order) (Atchison, KS)
 Northeast High (KCMO)
 North Kansas City High (NKCSD)
 Northland Christian (KCMO)
 Notre Dame de Sion (KCMO)
 Oak Grove High (Oak Grove)
 Oak Park High (NKSCD)
 Overland Christian Schools (Overland Park, KS)
 Park Hill High (Park Hill)
 Park Hill South High (Park Hill)
 Paseo Academy (KCMO)
 Platte County High School (Platte County)
 Plaza Heights Christian Academy (Blue Springs)
 Raymore-Peculiar High School (Raymore & Peculiar towns)
 Raytown Senior High School (Raytown)
 Raytown South High (Raytown)
 The Pembroke Hill School (KCMO)
 Piper High School (KCKS)
 Rockhurst High School (KCMO)
 Ruskin High School, Kansas City, Mo
 St. Michael the Archangel Catholic High School (Lee's Summit, MO)
 St. Thomas Aquinas High School (Overland Park, Kansas)
 Southeast High (KCMO)
 Southwest Early College Campus (KCMO)
 St. James Academy (Lenexa, KS)
 St. Pius X High School (KCMO)
 St. Teresa's Academy (KCMO)
 Staley High (NKCSD)
 Summit Christian Academy (Lee’s Summit)
 Sumner Academy of Arts & Science (KCKS)
 Truman High (Independence)
 University Academy Charter School (Kansas City, MO)
 Turner High School (KCKS)
 Van Horn High (Independence)
 Washington High School (KCKS)
 Westport High (KCMO)
 Whitefield Academy (KCMO)
 William Chrisman High (Independence)
 Winnetonka High (NKCSD)
 Wyandotte High (KCKS)

Middle schools 
 Academie Lafayette (KCMO)
 Afrikan Centered Education Collegium Campus (KCMO)
 Antioch Middle (NKCSD)
 Argentine Middle (KCKS)
 Arrowhead Middle (KCKS)
 Belton Middle (Belton)
 Bernard C. Campbell (Lee's Summit)
 Bingham Middle (Independence)
 Bridger Middle (Independence)
 Brittany Hill Middle (Blue Springs)
 Center Middle School (C58)
 Central Middle (KCKS)
 Christ the King (KCKS)
 Congress Middle (Park Hill)
 Coronado Middle (KCKS)
 Delta Woods Middle (Blue Springs)
 Discovery Middle (Liberty)
 Eisenhower Middle (KCKS)
 Eastgate 6th Grade Center (NKCSD)
 Gateway 6th Grade Center (NKCSD)
 Grandview Middle (Grandview)
 Heritage Middle (Liberty)
 Kansas City Academy (MO)
 Kansas City Middle School of the Arts (KCMO)
 Lakeview Middle (Park Hill)
 Liberty Middle (Liberty)
 Lincoln College Preparatory Academy (KCMO)
 Maple Park Middle (NKCSD)
 Moreland Ridge Middle (Blue Springs)
 New Mark Middle (NKCSD)
 Northgate Middle (NKCSD)
 Northland Christian (KCMO)
 Northeast Middle School (KCMO)
 Northwest Magnet Middle (KCKS)
 Nowlin Middle (Independence)
 Oak Grove Middle (Oak Grove)
 Osage Trail Middle (Ft. Osage-Independence)
 Overland Christian Schools (Overland Park, KS)
 Paul Kinder Middle (Blue Springs)
 Pioneer Ridge Middle (Independence)
 Platte City Middle School (Platte County)
 Plaza Middle (Park Hill)
 Pleasant Lea Middle (Lee's Summit)
 Raymore-Peculiar East Middle (Raymore)
 Raymore-Peculiar South Middle (Raymore) Opens in 2017
 Raytown Middle (Raytown)
 Raytown Central (Raytown) 
 Raytown South (Raytown)
 The Pembroke Hill School (KCMO)
 Rosedale Middle (KCKS)
 South Valley Middle School (Liberty)
 Smith-Hale Middle (Hickman Mills-KCMO)
 Summit Lakes Middle (Lee's Summit)
 Southwest Early College Campus (KCMO)
 University Academy Charter School (Kansas City, MO)
 Walden Middle (Park Hill)
 West Middle (KCKS)
 Whitefield Academy

Elementary schools 
 Academie Lafayette (KCMO)
 Afrikan Centered Education Collegium Campus (KCMO)
 Alexander Doniphan Elementary School (Liberty)
 Boone Elementary School (C58)
 Briarcliff Elementary (NKCSD)
 Benton Elementary (Independence)
 Bell Prairie Elementary (NKCSD)
 Center Elementary School (C58)
 Chinn Elementary (Park Hill)
 Chouteau Elementary (NKCSD)
 Christian Ott Elementary (Independence)
 Emerson Elementary (KCKS)
  Douglass Elementary (KCKS)
 English Landing Elementary (Park Hill)
 Fox Hill Elementary (NKCSD)
 Fairmount Elementary (Independence)
 Franklin Elementary School (Liberty)
 Gashland Elementary (NKCSD)
 Gladden Elementary (Belton)
 Gracemor Elementary (NKCSD)
 Graden Elementary (Park Hill)
 Hazel Grove Elementary]] (KCKS)
 Hawthorn Elementary (Park Hill)
 Hillcrest Elementary (Belton)
 Hopewell Elementary (Park Hill)
 Indian Creek Elementary School (C58)
 Kellybrook Elementary School (Liberty)
 Lewis and Clark Elementary School (Liberty)
 Liberty Oaks Elementary School (Liberty)
 Lillian Schumacher Elementary School (Liberty)
 Linden West Elementary (NKCSD)
 Line Creek Elementary (Park Hill)
 Manor Hill Elementary School (Liberty)
 Maple Elementary (Oak Grove)
 Maplewood Elementary (NKCSD)
 Nashua Elementary School (NKCSD)
 New Stanley Elementary (KCKS)
  Northland Christian (KCMO)
 Overland Christian Schools (Overland Park, KS)
 The Pembroke Hill School (KCMO)
 Prairie Point Elementary (Park Hill)
 Ravenwood Elementary (NKCSD)
 Red Bridge Academy
 Red Bridge Elementary School (C58)
 Renner Elementary (Park Hill)
 Ridgeview Elementary School (Liberty)
 Rising Hill Elementary (NKCSD)
 St. Paul's Episcopal Day School), (Westport)
 Santa Fe Trail Elementary (Independence)
 Scott Elementary (Belton)
 Shoal Creek Elementary School (Liberty)
 St. Patrick School (Kansas City, MO)
 Southeast Elementary (Park Hill)
 Sugar Creek Elementary (Independence)
 Three Trails Elementary (Independence)
 Tiffany Ridge Elementary (Park Hill)
 Topping Elementary (NKCSD)
 University Academy Charter School (Kansas City, MO)
 Union Chapel Elementary (Park Hill)
 Warren Hills Elementary School (Liberty)
 Whitefield Academy
 Whittier Elementary (KCKS)

Education in Kansas City, Missouri
Education in Kansas City, Kansas
Kansas City
Kansas City